Yevgeny Fyodorov may refer to:
 Yevgeny Alexeyevich Fyodorov (born 1963),  Russian politician and deputy of the State Duma
 Yevgeny Konstantinovich Fyodorov (1910–1981), Soviet geophysicist, statesman, and public figure
 Yevgeny Petrovich Fyodorov, Soviet Air Force general
 Yevgeny Vasilyevich Fyodorov (born 2000), Kazakh cyclist
 Yevgeny Yurievich Fyodorov (born 1980), Russian ice hockey player